South Malaka is a locality/township of Allahabad, Uttar Pradesh, India. It is close to the railway track connecting Allahabad to Varanasi and Gorakhpur. The other important institutions in the locality are Government Inter College and U.P.Government Central Library.

References

Neighbourhoods in Allahabad